Musically Incorrect is the tenth studio album by the American hard rock/heavy metal band Y&T. It was released in 1995 through the Music for Nations label. It was the first Y&T release since reuniting in 1995, and contains the same line-up as when the band disbanded in 1991.

Track listing

Personnel
Dave Meniketti –vocals, guitar, producer, assistant engineer, art direction
Stef Burns - guitar
Phil Kennemore – bass, backing vocals (Lead vocals and keyboards on "Nowhere Land"), producer
Jimmy DeGrasso – drums, percussion, cover concept
Production
Scott Boorey – producer, engineer, mixing at The Space Station, Santa Clara, California
Phil De Lancie – mastering at Fantasy Studios, Berkeley, California

References

Y&T albums
1995 albums